is a retreat including a Japanese garden and a house in Matsuyama, Ehime. This was once a villa or a humble cottage of Kurita Chodō, a haiku poet of the Edo period. Today, part of the house was restored to preserve its original form as one of the special historic sites in Ehime, and NPO corporation GCM Kōshin-an Club are involved in voluntary activities to promote it.

History 
The villa was built in 1800, in the style of Matsuo Bashō's Genju-an, by Kurita Chodō to spend the rest of his life peacefully and deepen exchange with haiku poets in Matsuyama. Chodō enjoyed haiku gatherings, tea ceremony and simply viewing the garden. Then he wrote about his reclusive life in this cottage in his journal Kōshin-an ki (庚申庵記). According to the journal, Chodō named his cottage "Kōshin-an" for the year of its construction, Kōshin. After the original owner's death, the house had been used to entertain guests by local people over many years. To match the needs of each owner, extensions and reconstructions are repeated. From then on, in about 200 years, the house had been abandoned and affected by natural disasters. However, local residents might struggle to preserve the place and refurbished it. The house still has original shape and atmosphere. Although the surrounding area was destroyed during World War II, the cottage including the garden miraculously remained. After the investigation and restoration with removal of extended section, Kōshin-an was restored much as it was in Edo era. In 2003, the house and its garden was opened as a historic garden.

Structure
The house was originally composed of three rooms with an entrance. One of the rooms was called "yojo-han" or four and half tatami mats, and used for haiku gatherings. The room is rather unusual that it has no tokonoma; an alcove where art or flowers are displayed. So there was no Kamiza (place of honor) there. It is because Chodō wanted his guests to be equal in the gatherings, regardless of their social status. Another room was "sanjo" or three tatami mats room which is used for tea ceremony and enjoying talking with friends. The "nijo" or two tatami mats room was used for his daily life. Thanks to the research of members of the house, it was found out that kitchen and bathroom were added onto the house, the entrance was modified. As for the rooms, relatively new materials are used in "yojo-han" and "nijo" tatami rooms, and it shows that these rooms were modified after his time.

Entrance and garden
In the entrance gate, The kuhi include a haiku by Kurita Chodō:

草の戸乃ふる幾友也梅の花　（樗堂題）
kusa no to no furuki tomo nari ume no hana

the grassy door
an old friend
with the plum tree

Originally, This poem was written in a hanging scroll in the house. Chodō took white ume blossom planted in front of the retreat Kōshin-an in this poem.
Wisteria, originally planted 250 years ago and provided shade in his time, is full bloom around the end of April. There is a stone statue of Jizō stands looking over the garden.

See also
 List of Historic Sites of Japan (Ehime)

Notes

Matsuyama, Ehime